Cephalaeschna acutifrons is a species of dragonfly in the family Aeshnidae. It is endemic to India.

References

Sources

Insects of India
Aeshnidae
Insects described in 1909
Taxonomy articles created by Polbot